CX Draconis is an interacting binary star system in the northern constellation of Draco, abbreviated CX Dra. It has the designation HD 174237 in the Henry Draper Catalogue; CX Draconis is the variable star designation. This is a double-lined spectroscopic binary system with a near circular orbit. The brightness of the system undergoes long-term irregular fluctuations, ranging from an apparent visual magnitude of 5.68 down to 5.99. Based on parallax measurements, it is located at a distance of approximately 1,150 light years from the Sun.

In 1921, this target was found to have a varying radial velocity by J. S. Plaskett and associates. It was shown to be a Be star by O. C. Mohler in 1940, and in 1965 M. Lacoarret studied variations in the hydrogen alpha emission profiles from the target. This system was discovered to be a photometric variable by P. Merlin in 1975. P. Koubský measured the radial velocity variations in 1976, and in 1978 published orbital elements for this binary system with a period of 6.696 days. He found that the variation in emission lines matched the time scale of the orbit, indicating that this is an interacting binary.

Using observations from the Einstein Observatory, in 1984 this system was shown to be an X-ray source by E. F. Guinan and associates. This emission may be coming from the cooler secondary that is phase-locked with the primary and is magnetically active due to rapid rotation. In 1992, J. Horn and associates determined that the secondary component is an evolved F-type giant star. Evidence suggests this star is overflowing its Roche lobe with gas streaming toward the primary.

Models indicate that the main source of the H-alpha emission is located mid-way between the two stars, with other emission lines originating from an accretion disk orbiting the primary. The circumstellar environment is changing in cycles lasting hundreds of days. Infrared emission to the northeast of the system suggests it may be undergoing systematic mass loss.

References

Further reading

Be stars
F-type giants
Spectroscopic binaries
Gamma Cassiopeiae variable stars
Rotating ellipsoidal variables

Draco (constellation)
7084
Durchmusterung objects
174237
092133
Objects with variable star designations